Below is a sortable list of compositions by Eric Coates.  The works are categorized by genre, date of composition and title.

References

Sources
 Music on the Web – Eric Coates: Orchestral Works
 Music on the Web – Eric Coates: Songs and Ballads

 
Coates, Eric, List of compositions by